Nationality words link to articles with information on the nation's poetry or literature (for instance, Irish or France).

Events

Works published
 Thomas Dekker, Dekker his Dreame
 Sir Thomas Overbury, The First and Second Part of the Remedy of Love, translated from Ovid, Remedia amoris; published posthumously (died 1613)
 Henry Peacham the younger, Thalias Banquet: Furnished with an hundred and odde dishes of newly devised epigrammes
 Francis Quarles, A Feast of Wormes: Set forth in a poem of the history of Jonah
 Samuel Rowlands, The Night-Raven

Births
Death years link to the corresponding "[year] in poetry" article:
 January 5 – Miklós Zrínyi (died 1664), Croatian and Hungarian warrior, statesman and poet
 July 20 – Nikolaes Heinsius (died 1681), Dutch poet and scholar
Also:
 Alexander Brome (died 1666), English
 István Gyöngyösi (died 1704), Hungarian poet
 Abdul Hakim (died unknown), poet in medieval Bengal
 Pierre Perrin (died 1675), French poet and libretto composer

Deaths
Birth years link to the corresponding "[year] in poetry" article:
 January 23 (bur.) – Robert Tofte (born 1562), English translator and poet
 February 6 (bur.) – Richard Barnfield (born 1574), English poet
 February 13 – Siôn Phylip (born 1543), Welsh language poet
 February 19 – Roemer Visscher (born 1547), Dutch merchant and writer, especially of epigrams and emblemata
 March 1 – Thomas Campion (born 1567), English composer, poet and physician
 Also: Piotr Kochanowski (born 1566), Polish

See also

 Poetry
 16th century in poetry
 16th century in literature

Notes

17th-century poetry
Poetry